Ajilimójili is a hot or hot and sweet chili sauce from Puerto Rico, traditionally served over grilled seafood, vegetables, pasteles, boiled tuber vegetables and especially grilled meats.

Description 
Ajilimójili is a combination of olive oil,  garlic, cilantro, chilies, green bell pepper, cumin, oregano, vinegar, citrus (lemon, lime or sour orange) chopped or blended, simmered and cooled to serve. A variant, sweet ajilimójili, adds ingredients such as sweet red peppers, ajicitos, honey, tomato sauce and butter.

The sauce is one of the essential elements of Puerto Rican cooking.

See also 

 Puerto Rican cuisine
 Salsa (sauce)
 Mojo (sauce)

References

External links 
 Sweet Ajilimójili recipe in The New York Times
 Ajilimójili recipe at epicurious.com

Chili sauce and paste
Latin American cuisine
Puerto Rican cuisine
Sauces